Leonid Nikolayevich Murzin (May 27, 1930 – October 13, 1996) was a Soviet and Russian linguist, the Dean of philological faculty at Perm State University (1964–1967), the founder and the head of General and Slavonic linguistics department at Perm State University; the head of Perm derivatology school; he founded the Institute of dynamic linguistics. Perm deivatology school encouraged the development of such linguistic school as "Computer based simulation of verbal communication".

Sources
 Leonid Murzin at Russian Wikipedia: Мурзин, Леонид Николаевич // Википедия, свободная энциклопедия.
 Video with Leonid Murzin on YouTube
 The problems of dynamic linguistics: the proceedings of International conference, dedicated to the 80th Murzin's anniversary (in Russian) / отв. ред. В. А. Мишланов; Перм. ун-т. Пермь, 2010. С. 296—304. (Zip-архив материалов конференции).

References

1930 births
1996 deaths
Linguists from Russia
Academic staff of Perm State University
20th-century linguists